"Two Pink Lines" is a song co-written and recorded by American country music artist Eric Church. It was released in August 2006 as the second single from his 2006 debut album Sinners Like Me. Church wrote the song with Victoria Shaw.

Content
The narrator befriends and has sexual intercourse with a woman during his young adult years. She takes a pregnancy test and the male becomes concerned over the results. When the test produces a negative result, the two of them are relieved, and she leaves.

Critical reception
The song received a favorable review from Deborah Evans Price of Billboard, who wrote that "Church and co-writer Shaw have carefully crafted the lyric so the listener is drawn into the story, and Church's engaging performance brings the characters to life as they sit waiting for their future to unfold." In 2017, Billboard contributor Chuck Dauphin put "Two Pink Lines" at number five on his top 10 list of Church's best songs.

Music video
The music video was directed by Peter Zavadil and premiered in August 8, 2006.

Chart performance
The song debuted at number 52 on the U.S. Billboard Hot Country Songs chart for the week of September 2, 2006.

References

2006 singles
Eric Church songs
Songs written by Victoria Shaw (singer)
Songs written by Eric Church
Music videos directed by Peter Zavadil
Song recordings produced by Jay Joyce
Capitol Records Nashville singles
2006 songs
Songs about pregnancy